Dog's Life is a 2003 video game for the Sony PlayStation 2.

Dog's Life may refer to:

Music
"A Dog's Life", song by Nina Nastasia on her Dogs album
"Dog's Life", song by eels from the Welcome to Woop Woop soundtrack
"Dog's Life", song by Gentle Giant from the Octopus (Gentle Giant album) album

Literature
 "Dog's Life", short story by Martha Soukup
A Dog's Life, 1987 collection of short stories by Ma Jian
 A Dog's Life, 1995 novel by Peter Mayle with Ed Koren
 A Dog's Life, 1996 English translation by Anthea Bell of Der Hund kommt!, 1987 children's novel by Christine Nöstlinger
A Dog's Life: The Autobiography of a Stray, 2005 children's novel by Ann M. Martin

TV and film
A Dog's Life, 1918 silent film written and directed by Charlie Chaplin
A Dog's Life (1950 film) (Vita da cani), 1950 Italian film starring Gina Lollobrigida
Another name for the 1962 film Mondo Cane
"McGurk: A Dog's Life", unsold 1979 TV pilot by Norman Lear and starring Barney Martin
 "A Dog Life", a 1991 episode of Shining Time Station

See also 
 It's a Dog's Life (disambiguation)